The Central Region (Región Central) is one of the 10 administrative regions in which Venezuela is divided. It's conformed by the states Aragua, Carabobo and Cojedes.

It is bordered by the Caribbean Sea to the north, the Capital Region and the Llanos Region to the east, the Western Central Region to the west and the Andes Region to the south. The main and most populated city in this region is Valencia, in the State of Carabobo.

History

The region was created in the presidential decree N.° 72 of 1969. As in the whole country, after the beginning of the democratic era, a regionalization policy begins to develop. By 1969, thanks to the presidential decree, the first legal element from which regionalization in the region and throughout the country would begin. This decree creates the Central Region as well as 8 other regions in the country, in addition to laying the foundations for the creation of different regional organizations.

Geography
The region is made up of the states of Aragua, Carabobo and Cojedes. It occupies an area of 26,000 km2.

Limits of the Central Region

It is bordered to the north by a portion of the Caribbean Sea Coastal Coast and the Capital Region; to the east by the Capital Region and part of the Plains Region; to the west by the Western Central Region and to the south by the Plains Region and the State of Barinas.

Gallery

References 

Regions of Venezuela